The British Concession or Settlement was a foreign enclave (a "concession") in Shanghai within the Qing Empire which existed from around 1845 until its unification with the American area, located directly north of it across Suzhou Creek (Soochow Creek) to form the Shanghai International Settlement in 1863.

The settlement was bordered at north by the right bank of Suzhou Creek before it flows into the Huangpu River, at east by the Huangpu, and at south by a channel, the Yangjing Bang (Yang-King-Pang, now Yan'an Road), which would be the future boundary with the French Concession.

History
The British occupied Shanghai during the First Opium War and it was opened to foreign trade by the terms of the Treaty of Nanking. The British settlement was established by the 1845 Land Regulations, undertaken on the initiative of the intendant Gong Mujiu. On 20 November 1846, a formal concession was established; this was expanded on 27 November 1848. After a proposal to make Shanghai an independent "free city" was rejected in 1862, the British area agreed to merge with the American on 21 September 1863 as the Shanghai International Settlement. This occurred in December of the same year.

See also
 Shanghai International Settlement
 American Concession (Shanghai)
 Shanghai French Concession
 List of former foreign enclaves in China

References 

Shanghai International Settlement
Concessions in China